Back in Town is an album by singer Matt Dusk that was released by Decca in 2006.

Track listing

Bonus tracks
 "The Way You Look Tonight"
 "Besame Mucho"
 "History Repeating"

Personnel
Credits adapted from the Back in Town liner notes.

Musicians
 Matt Dusk – vocals 
 John Chiodini – guitar 
 John Faux – guitar 
 Ilya Toshinski – guitar , banjo 
 Chuck Berghofer – acoustic bass 
 Spencer Campbell – electric bass 
 Neil Stubenhaus – electric bass 
 Vinnie Colaiuta – drums 
 Shannon Forrest – drums 
 Paulinho da Costa – percussion 
 Dan Greco – percussion 
 Eric Darken – percussion 
 Tom Ranier – piano 
 Randy Kerber – piano 
 Mike Lang – piano , celeste 
 Rob Wells – programming, keyboards 
 "Big" Jim Right – B3 organ 

Technical
 Al Schmitt – mixing 
 Chris Lord-Alge – mixing 
 Terry Sawchuk – mixing 
 Doug Sax – mastering

Imagery
 Garnet Armstrong – art direction, design
 Linda Philp – design
 Mitch Jenkins – photography
 Damon Allan – styling, custom clothing

Charts

References

2006 albums
Albums recorded at Capitol Studios
Decca Records albums
Matt Dusk albums